Feesburg is a small unincorporated community in northern Lewis Township, Brown County, Ohio, United States.  It is located on State Route 505. The ZIP code for Feesburg, Ohio is 45119.

History
Feesburg was laid out in 1835 by Thomas J. Fee, and named for him. A post office has been in operation at Feesburg since 1841.

Gallery

References 

Unincorporated communities in Brown County, Ohio
Unincorporated communities in Ohio
1835 establishments in Ohio
Populated places established in 1835